Fairfield is one of the most central wards in the London Borough of Wandsworth, London.  Fairfield contains mostly Wandsworth Town and a large neighbourhood in Battersea.  Fairfield contains Wandsworth High Street, Old York Road and the council buildings themselves.  The ward forms a cross shape, running from Mexfield Road on the edge of Putney in the west, to Plough Road near Clapham Junction in the east, and from the River Thames to the west of Wandsworth Bridge in the north, to Allfarthing Lane to the east of Garratt Lane in the south.

Demographics

The ward has a young demographic, with 62% of the population between the ages of 20 and 44.  52% of the population is female.

Councillors
 William Sweet (Conservative Party)
 Piers McCausland (Conservative Party)
 Rory O'Broin (Conservative Party)

Wards of the London Borough of Wandsworth